Russia Dock Woodland is a long narrow park in Rotherhithe, London, created by the infilling of one of the former Surrey Commercial Docks. The former Russia Dock was originally used for the importing of softwood timber from Norway, Russia and Sweden. Known as "deal wood", it was mostly used for newsprint and for manufacturing furniture.
Following the closure of the docks in the early 1970s, the area was redeveloped by the London Docklands Development Corporation (LDDC). Russia Dock Woodland was made up of a number of docks, including Russia Dock, Island Dock and Surrey Basin, which were infilled (save for a thin 'stream' through the woodland) and planted as a  woodland in 1980. The Woodland still contains surviving dock features including the retaining wall capstones, depth gauges, bollards, mooring chains and tracks.

Management
The woodlands were established by the LDDC and were handed over toand are now managed bySouthwark Council with the assistance of the Friends of Russia Dock Woodland. The LDDC established various footbridges (including the Alfred Salter footbridge) and paths (including Waterman's path along the stream) through the woods, which are now maintained by Southwark Council. The Conservation Volunteers (formerly the Trust for Urban Ecology) maintain the neighbouring Stave Hill Ecological Park. Both areas are an excellent resource for residents of and visitors to Rotherhithe.

Stave Hill

It provides views over Canary Wharf, the City of London, and much of south and central London; on clear days the view stretches as far as Wembley Stadium.

It was created in 1985 by the LDDC, using waste material and rubble from the works to fill and landscape the former commercial docks.

References

External links

Russia Dock Woodland on the Woodland Trust website

Forests and woodlands of London
Parks and open spaces in the London Borough of Southwark
London docks
Redeveloped ports and waterfronts in London
Rotherhithe